Jean-François Robillon (born 27 May 1962) is a Monegasque politician, writer and doctor, who is currently a National Councillor in Monaco. He previously served as President of the National Council; following the resignation of Stéphane Valeri, Robillon was elected the 11th President by a nineteen to three majority on 11 January 2010. However, in the 2013 parliamentary election, Robillon's coalition, Union Monegasque lost control of the National Council, and as such, Robillon lost his presidency. 
 
Robillon specializes in Cardiovascular Pathology, and has either authored or co-authored thirty medical publications on this topic. He is an active member of Conseil de l'Ordre; the medical oversight commission in Monaco. Outside politics Robillon serves as a board member for both the Prince Albert II of Monaco Foundation, and the Association SHARE, which engages in improving education and health in developing countries.

In 2007, Prince Albert II presented him with the Order of Saint-Charles.

References

External links
Jean-François Robillon at the National Council
Interview with Jean-François Robillon: Environment 
Interview with Jean-François Robillon: Economy

Living people
1962 births
Presidents of the National Council (Monaco)